China Yuchai International Limited, a holding company listed in NYSE, was established in 1993, and is currently headquartered  in Singapore. The firm has two components:  Guangxi Yuchai Machinery Company Limited ("GYMCL"), which engages in engine manufacturing, and HL Global Enterprises Limited ("HLGE"), which operates in the hospitality industry. The firm also owns a 12.2% interest in Thakral Corporation Ltd ("TCL") (2012.4), a distributor of  consumer electronic products and investor in property and equity.

Products 
The GYMCL division produces engines for highway vehicles, generator sets, and marine and industrial applications. It also offers diesel-related products, such as power generators and other engines. Its products include the YC6K diesel engine, high-horsepower marine diesel engines (YC6T, YC6C, YC12VT, YC8C, 4D20), power generation engines, and the 4D20 4-cylinder passenger car engine.

The HLGE division operates hotels and other properties in China and Malaysia.

The TCL group markets digital cameras, data projectors, iPhones, iPads and audio products, plasma and light-emitting diode (LED) televisions, desktop and notebook computers. The division also has its own brand: YES brand.

Operations

Executive leadership 
Weng Ming Hoh  is the current president and the Director of the company.

Recent developments 
 2013.9, the company's product YC6K 6 cylinder 12L series of engines won the European Union's ("EU") E-mark certification.
 2013.6, China Yuchai International Limited announced its subsidiary "GYMCL", Y&C Engine Co., Ltd.  Baotou Bei Ben Heavy Duty Truck Co., Ltd. and Inner Mongolia First Machinery Group Co., Ltd. formed a new joint venture company (“JV Company”) in Baotou, Inner Mongolia. In October, 2013,  China Yuchai International Limited announced changes in the ownership structure of the joint venture.

Guangxi Yuchai Machinery Company Limited

The Guangxi Yuchai Machinery Co. Ltd was Established in 1951 as a manufacturer of Automobile, Marine and Stationary Diesel Engines such as Trucks, Buses, Passenger Vehicles, Construction Equipment, Marine and Agricultural Applications. Their Headquarters is located at Yulin, Guangxi Province, China, and it has seven production bases such as Fujian, Jiangsu, Anhui and Shandong etc.

In 2012, amid continuous market slump, Yuchai registered an excessive sale volume of 11,000 units.

Engines 

Truck Engines

YC4D - 4.2 litre Turbocharged and intercooled inline-four cylinder, four stroke cycle, water cooled cycle diesel engine rated from 

YC4FA - 2.9 litre Turbocharged and Intercooled inline-four cylinder, four-stroke cycle, water cooled, diesel engine with Bosch Electronically Controlled high pressure Common rail System rated from 

YC6A - 7.2 litre Turbocharged and Intercooled inline-six cylinder four-stroke cycle, water cooled, diesel engine with Bosch Electronically Controlled high pressure Common rail System and SCR Post-Processing rated from 

YC6J - 6.4 litre Turbocharged and Intercooled inline-six cylinder, four-stroke cycle, water cooled, diesel engine with Bosch Electronically Controlled high pressure Common rail System and SCR Post-Processing rated from 

YC6L - 8.4 litre Turbocharged and Intercooled inline-six cylinder, four-stroke cycle, water cooled, diesel engine with Bosch Electronically Controlled high pressure Common rail System and SCR Post-Processing rated from 

YC6M/MK - 9.8 to 10.3 litre Turbocharged and Intercooled inline-six cylinder, four-stroke cycle, water cooled, diesel engine with Bosch Electronically Controlled high pressure Common rail System and SCR Post-Processing rated from 

Bus Engines

YC4D - 4.2 litre Turbocharged and Intercooled, inline four cylinder, four-stroke cycle, water cooled, diesel engine rated from 

YC4E - 4.2 litre Turbocharged and Intercooled inline-four cylinder, four-stroke cycle, water cooled, diesel engine with Bosch Electronically Controlled high pressure Common rail System and SCR Post-Processing rated from 

YC4F - 2.9 litre Turbocharged and Intercooled inline-four cylinder, four-stroke cycle, water cooled, diesel engine rated from 

YC4FA - 2.9 litre Turbocharged and Intercooled inline-four cylinder four-stroke cycle, water cooled, diesel engine with Bosch Electronically Controlled high pressure Common rail System rated from 

YC4G - 5.9 litre Turbocharged and Intercooled inline-four cylinder four-stroke cycle, water cooled, diesel engine with Bosch Electronically Controlled high pressure Common rail System and SCR Post-Processing rated from 

YC6A - 7.2 litre Turbocharged and Intercooled inline-six cylinder, four-stroke cycle, water cooled, diesel engine with Bosch Electronically Controlled high pressure Common rail System and SCR Post-Processing rated from 

YC6G - 7.8 litre Turbocharged and Intercooled inline-six cylinder, four-stroke, water cooled, diesel engine with Bosch Electronically Controlled high pressure Common rail System and SCR Post Processing rated from 

YC6J - 6.4 litre Turbocharged and Intercooled inline-six cylinder, four-stroke cycle, water cooled, diesel engine with Bosch Electronically Controlled high pressure Common rail System and SCR Post-Processing rated from  

YC6L - 8.4 litre Turbocharged and Intercooled inline-six cylinder, four-stroke cycle, water cooled, diesel engine with Bosch Electronically Controlled high pressure Common rail System and SCR Post-Processing rated from 

YC6MK - 10.3 litre Turbocharged and Intercooled inline-six cylinder, four-stroke cycle, water cooled, diesel engine with Bosch Electronically Controlled high pressure Common rail System and SCR Post-Processing rated from 

Agricultural Engines

YC4A - 4.8 litre Turbocharged and Intercooled inline-four cylinder, four-stroke cycle, water cooled, diesel engine with Tier 2 Emission Compliant rated from 

YC4B - 4.5 litre Turbocharged and Intercooled inline-four cylinder, four-stroke cycle, water cooled, diesel engine with Tier 2 Emission  Compliant rated from 

YC4D - 4.2 litre Turbocharged and Intercooled inline-four cylinder, four-stroke cycle, water cooled, diesel engine with Tier 2 Emission Compliant rated from 

YC4F - 2.6 litre Turbocharged and Intercooled inline-four cylinder four-stroke cycle, water cooled, diesel engine with Tier 2 Emission Compliant rated only 

YC6A - 7.2 litre Turbocharged and Intercooled inline-six cylinder, four-stroke cycle, water cooled, diesel engine with Tier 2 Emission Compliant rated from 

YC6B - 6.8 litre Turbocharged and Intercooled inline-six cylinder, four-stroke cycle, water cooled, diesel engine with Tier 2 Emission Compliant rated from 

YC6J - 6.4 litre Turbocharged and Intercooled inline-six cylinder, four-stroke cycle, water cooled, diesel engine with Tier 2 Emission Compliant rated from

Construction Machinery Engines 

Loader Engines

YC4D - 4.2 litre Naturally Asipirated, inline-four cylinder four stroke cycle, water cooled, diesel engine with Tier 2 Emission Compliant rated only 

YC4B - 4.5 litre Naturally Aspirated inline-four cylinder, four-stroke cycle, water cooled, diesel engine with Tier 2 Emission Compliant rated only 

YC4A - 4.8 litre Turbocharged and Intercooled inline-four cylinder, four-stroke cycle, water cooled, diesel engine with Tier 2 Emission Compliant rated only 

YC6J - 6.4 litre Turbocharged and Intercooled inline-six cylinder, four-stroke cycle, water cooled, diesel engine with Tier 2 Emission Compliant rated only 

YC6B - 6.8 litre Turbocharged and Intercooled inline-six cylinder, four stroke cycle, water cooled, diesel engine with Tier 2 Emission Compliant rated only 

YC6MK - 9.8 litre Turbocharged and Imtercooled inline-six cylinder four stroke cycle, water cooled, diesel engine with Tier 2 Emission Compliant rated only 

Forklift Engines

YC4A - 4.8 litre Turbocharged inline-four cylinder diesel engine with Tier 2 Emission Compliant rated only 

YC6B - 6.8 litre Naturally Aspirated inline-six cylinder diesel engine with Tier 2 Emission Compliant rated only 

YC6A - 7.2 litre Turbocharged inline-six cylinder diesel engine with Tier 2 Emission Compliant rated only 

Excavator Engines

YC4D - 4.2 litre Turbocharged inline-four cylinder diesel engine with Tier 2 Emission Compliant rated only 

YC6A - 6.4 litre Naturally Aspirated inline-six cylinder diesel engine with Tier 2 Emission Compliant rated only 

Road Roller Engines

YC6B/YC6A - 6.8-7.8 litre Naturally Aspirated/Turbocharged and Intercooled inline-six cylinder diesel engine with Tier 2 Emission Compliant rated from 

Drilling Rig Engines

YC4D - 4.2 litre Turbocharged inline-four cylinder diesel engine with Tier 2 Emission Compliant rated from 

YC6M - 9.8 litre Turbocharged inline-six cylinder diesel engine with Tier 2 Emission Compliant rated only 

Mining Truck Engines

YC6M - 10.3 litre Turbocharged inline-six cylinder diesel engine with Tier 2 Emission Compliant rated from

Marine Engines 

YC4F- 2.6 litre Turbocharged and Imtercooled Vertical inline-four cylinder four-stroke cycle water cooled diesel engine rated from 

YC4D - 4.2 litre Turbocharged and Intercooled Vertical inline-four cylinder four-stroke cycle water cooled diesel engine rated from

YC6A - 7.2 litre Turbocharged and Intercooled Vertical inline-six cylinder four-stroke cycle water cooled diesel engine rated from 

YC6B/YC6J - 6.4-6.8 litre Naturally Aspirated/Turbocharged and Intercooled Vertical inline-six cylinder four-stroke cycle water cooled diesel engine rated from 

YC6CL/YC6C - 39.5-54.6 litre Turbocharged and Intercooled Vertical inline-six cylinder four-stroke cycle water cooled diesel engine rated from 

YC6T - 16.3 litre Turbocharged and Intercooled Vertical inline-six cylinder four-stroke cycle water cooled diesel engine rated from

Awards 
 2013.5, China Yuchai International Limited's subsidiary, Guangxi Yuchai Machinery Company Limited, won the "Gold Cup Award" and the "Annual Service Award" by Commercial Vehicle in China.

References

External links 

Holding companies of Singapore
Engine manufacturers of Singapore
Diesel engine manufacturers
Holding companies established in 1993
Manufacturing companies established in 1993
Companies listed on the New York Stock Exchange
Singaporean companies established in 1993